Reginald Carter (October 10, 1957 – December 24, 1999) was an American basketball player. At 6'3" (1.90 m) and 175 lb (79 kg), he played as a guard. Born in New York City, Carter played collegiately for the St. John's University and the University of Hawaii after spending his schoolboy years starring for Long Island Lutheran High School in Brookville, New York. Carter was selected by the National Basketball Association's New York Knicks in the second round (27th pick overall) of the 1979 NBA Draft. He played with the Knicks from 1980 to 1982 in a total of 135 games. Carter became an assistant principal at Mineola High School before dying of a rare disease likened to tuberculosis.

References

External links

1957 births
1999 deaths
All-American college men's basketball players
American men's basketball players
Hawaii Rainbow Warriors basketball players
New York Knicks draft picks
New York Knicks players
People from Brookville, New York
Point guards
Basketball players from New York City
St. John's Red Storm men's basketball players